David John Van Drunen (born January 31, 1976) is a Canadian former professional ice hockey defenceman. He played one game in the National Hockey League game for the Ottawa Senators during the 1999–00 season, on December 13, 1999 against the Toronto Maple Leafs. The rest of his career, which lasted from 1997 to 2011, was spent in various minor leagues.

Career statistics

Regular season and playoffs

Awards and honours

See also
List of players who played only one game in the NHL

External links

1976 births
Living people
Baton Rouge Kingfish players
Canadian ice hockey defencemen
Cincinnati Cyclones (IHL) players
Dayton Bombers players
Detroit Vipers players
Grand Rapids Griffins players
Grand Rapids Griffins (IHL) players
Hershey Bears players
Ice hockey people from Alberta
Mobile Mysticks players
Muskegon Fury players
Odessa Jackalopes players
Ottawa Senators players
Portland Pirates players
Prince Albert Raiders players
Saginaw Gears (UHL) players
Sportspeople from Sherwood Park
Undrafted National Hockey League players